The 1978 Eisenhower Trophy took place 18 to 21 October at the Pacific Harbour Golf & Country Club in Navua, Viti Levu, Fiji. It was the 11th World Amateur Team Championship for the Eisenhower Trophy. The tournament was a 72-hole stroke play team event with 24 four-man teams. The best three scores for each round counted towards the team total.

United States won the Eisenhower Trophy for the seventh time, finishing 13 strokes ahead of the silver medalists, Canada. Australia took the bronze medal, five strokes further behind, while New Zealand finished fourth.  Bobby Clampett, United States, had the lowest individual score, one-under-par 287.

After the 1974 Eisenhower Trophy was moved from Malaysia to the Dominican Republic, the 1978 event had been allocated to the Asia/Australasia zone with the 1980 event allocated to the American zone and the 1982 event to the Europe/Africa zone.

Teams
24 teams contested the event. Each team except one had four players. The team representing South Korea had only three.

Scores

Source:

Individual leaders
There was no official recognition for the lowest individual scores.

Source:

References

External links
Record Book on International Golf Federation website 

Eisenhower Trophy
Golf tournaments in Fiji
Eisenhower Trophy
Eisenhower Trophy
Eisenhower Trophy